George Malcolm Laws (January 4, 1919 – August 1, 1994) was a scholar of traditional British and American folk song.

He was best known for his collection of traditional ballads "American Balladry from British Broadsides", published in 1957 by the American Folklore Society. He graduated from the University of Pennsylvania, and joined the English Department Faculty there in 1942. He gives his name to a system of coding ballads; one letter of the alphabet, followed by 2 numbers. For example, "Laws A01" is "Brave Wolfe" also known as "Bold Wolfe" or "The Battle of Quebec". There is no immediately obvious logic, but a broad pattern appears: the letter A is for military songs, the letter D is for nautical songs, the letter F is for murder, and so on. The system is limited to 26 x 99 = 2576 distinct labels, and so tends to bring together similar songs. It is a useful adjunct to Child numbers. He includes many songs that Child excluded, and of course, new ones that were found after Child died.

Examples of Laws numbers

 Laws A01 – Brave Wolfe
 Laws A02 – Major Andrews Execution
 Laws A03 – Stately Southerner
 Laws A04 – Paul Jones
 Laws A05 – James Bird
 Laws A06 – Constitution and the Guerriere
 Laws A07 – Battle of New Orleans
 Laws A08 – Texas Rangers
 Laws A09 – Manassa Junction
 Laws A11 – Battle of Shiloh Hill
 Laws A12 – Battle of Elkhorn Tavern

The letters A to H are for native American ballads.

 B
 Laws B01 – The Streets of Laredo

 F Murder Ballads
 Laws F05 – Banks of the Ohio

The letters J to Q are for "American Ballads from British Broadsides". 290 British ballads are indexed.

 J War ballads
 Laws J05 – The Bonny Bunch of Roses
 K Ballads of sailors and the sea
 Laws K09 – Lady Franklin's Lament
 Laws K33 – Coast of High Barbaree
 Laws K43 – Rosemary Lane
 L Ballads of crime and criminals
 Laws L05 – Jack Hall
 Laws L12 – The Rambling Boy, The Newry Highwayman
 M Ballads of family opposition to lovers
 Laws M04 – Drowsy Sleeper, Katie Dear, Silver Dagger
 Laws M32 – The Bramble Briar
 N Ballads of lovers' disguises and tricks
 Laws N07 – Jack Monroe
 Laws N21 – The Female Highwayman
 Laws N27 – The Blind Beggar of Bethnal Green
 Laws N42 – "John Riley", "John(ny) Riley", "The Broken Token" or "A Fair Young Maid All in Her Garden"
 O Ballads of faithful lovers
 Laws O03 – The Foggy Dew
 Laws O35 – The Trees They Grow So High
 Laws O36 – Polly Vaughn
 P Unfaithful lovers
 Laws P02 – Green Bushes
 Laws P24 – The Butcher's Boy
 Laws P25 – A Brisk Young Sailor Courted Me
 Laws P31 – All Around My Hat
 Laws P36 – Pretty Polly, The Gosport Tragedy, The Cruel Ship's Carpenter
 Q Humorous and miscellaneous
Laws Q02 – Marrowbones

Bibliography

 Native American Balladry (1950, revised 1964)
 American Balladry from British Broadsides (1957)
 American Ballads from British Broadsides: A guide for students and collectors of traditional song (1957)
 The British Literary Ballad: A Study in Poetic Imitation (1972)

See also
 Roud Folk Song Index

References

External links
biography

1919 births
1994 deaths
American folk-song collectors
American educational theorists
American folklorists
Educators from Philadelphia
University of Pennsylvania alumni
University of Pennsylvania faculty